This section of the list of former state routes in New York contains all routes numbered between 26 and 50.

References

 026